Francisco I. Madero is one of the 84 municipalities of Hidalgo, in central-eastern Mexico. The municipal seat lies at Tepatepec.  The municipality covers an area of 95.1 km².

As of 2005, the municipality had a total population of 29,466.

References

Municipalities of Hidalgo (state)